Trebišov District is a district in
the Košice Region of eastern Slovakia. 
Until 1918, the district was mostly part of the Hungarian county of Zemplén, apart from a small area 
in the south-east around Veľké Trakany which formed part of the county of Szabolcs.

Municipalities

Bačka
Bačkov
Bara
Biel
Boľ
Borša
Boťany
Brehov
Brezina
Byšta
Cejkov
Čeľovce
Čerhov
Černochov
Čierna
Čierna nad Tisou
Dargov
Dobrá
Dvorianky
Egreš
Hraň
Hrčeľ
Hriadky
Kašov
Kazimír
Klin nad Bodrogom
Kožuchov
Kráľovský Chlmec
Kravany
Kuzmice
Kysta
Ladmovce
Lastovce
Leles
Luhyňa
Malá Tŕňa
Malé Ozorovce
Malé Trakany
Malý Horeš
Malý Kamenec
Michaľany
Nižný Žipov
Novosad
Nový Ruskov
Parchovany
Plechotice
Poľany
Pribeník
Rad
Sečovce
Sirník
Slivník
Slovenské Nové Mesto
Soľnička
Somotor
Stanča
Stankovce
Strážne
Streda nad Bodrogom
Svätá Mária
Svätuše
Svinice
Trebišov
Trnávka
Veľaty
Veľká Tŕňa
Veľké Ozorovce
Veľké Trakany
Veľký Horeš
Veľký Kamenec
Viničky
Višňov
Vojčice
Vojka
Zatín
Zbehňov
Zemplín
Zemplínska Nová Ves
Zemplínska Teplica
Zemplínske Hradište
Zemplínske Jastrabie
Zemplínsky Branč

References

Districts of Slovakia
Geography of Košice Region